Shannonside Northern Sound is a dual radio franchise which operates across counties Cavan, Monaghan (Northern Sound Radio), Leitrim, Longford and Roscommon (Shannonside FM) in Ireland. It has a 46.9% market share.

History 
Shannonside FM and Northern Sound Radio were established in 1989 as separate radio stations. In 1995 both licences and franchise areas were combined to create the first regional station in Ireland.
In 2005, Shannonside Northern Sound was purchased by Radio Kerry Holdings.

Several high profile broadcasters started their careers at the station, including Damien O'Reilly, Ciaran Mullooly, Fran McNulty, Audrey Carville, Sinead Hussey, Justin Treacy, Niall Donnelly, Gareth O'Connor, Fintan Duffy and many others.

Shows 
The two stations have their own different schedules 7am-7pm weekdays, with the exception of The Joe Finnegan Show (9am - 11am). Outside of these times, the same programmes are broadcast across both stations.

Premises 
The franchise has 3 local bases:

Longford - Headquarters

Monaghan - studios, offices and broadcasting school, opened in October 2008

Cavan - studio and sales office, opened in July 2007

Frequencies 
Northern Sound Radio is broadcast on 96.3 MHz from Monaghan, 94.8 MHz from Cavan and 97.5 MHz from Carrickmacross. Shannonside FM is broadcast on 104.1 MHz (Longford/Roscommon), 97.2 MHz (South Leitrim), 95.7 MHz (Boyle), 104.6 MHz (West Roscommon).

Sister Station 
Radio Kerry

References

Radio stations in the Republic of Ireland